
Haldi Cones are a group of mountains located in Karakoram range in Ghanche district of Gilgit Baltistan in Pakistan. The granite peaks are located in Haldi village located at a distance of 25 km from Khaplu town. Most of these towers and cones are not climbed yet. While the peaks of Khane Valley located in the north of Haldi cones were climbed.

References

Mountain ranges of India
Landforms of Jammu and Kashmir
Mountain ranges of the Karakoram
Baltistan
Mountain ranges of Gilgit-Baltistan